Víctor de la Parte González (born 22 June 1986 in Vitoria-Gasteiz) is a Spanish cyclist, who currently rides for UCI ProTeam . He was named in the start list for the 2017 Giro d'Italia. In August 2019, he was named in the startlist for the 2019 Vuelta a España. De la Parte crashed out on stage 6 of the race, being one of four riders to abandon due to a crash.

Major results

2009
 10th Overall Vuelta a Extremadura
2010
 1st Stage 8 Circuito Montañés
2012
 1st  Overall Sibiu Cycling Tour
1st  Points classification
1st  Mountains classification
1st Stage 1
 2nd Overall Tour of Romania
1st Stage 8
 5th Overall Tour of Hainan
 8th Overall Tour of Szeklerland
2013
 1st  Overall Tour d'Algérie
1st Stage 5
 3rd Overall Tour de Blida
 4th Overall Tour of Bulgaria
 5th Overall Sibiu Cycling Tour
 6th Mayor Cup
2014
 2nd Overall Troféu Joaquim Agostinho
1st Prologue
 7th Overall Volta a Portugal
1st Prologue
2015
 1st  Overall Tour of Austria
1st Stages 4 & 6
 1st  Overall Flèche du Sud
 3rd Overall Oberösterreich Rundfahrt
1st Stage 1
 5th Overall Tour de Taiwan
 5th Raiffeisen Grand Prix
 7th Tour de Berne
 8th Race Horizon Park Maidan
 8th Coupe des Carpathes
 9th Race Horizon Park Classic
2016
 3rd Overall Tour of Croatia
 6th Overall Czech Cycling Tour
 10th Vuelta a Murcia
2019
 3rd Overall CRO Race
 10th Overall Tour of Austria
2020
 10th Overall UAE Tour
2021 
 4th Overall Vuelta a Asturias

Grand Tour general classification results timeline

References

External links

1986 births
Living people
Spanish male cyclists
Sportspeople from Vitoria-Gasteiz
Cyclists from the Basque Country (autonomous community)